Zavkhan is one of the 21 aimags (provinces) of Mongolia, located in the west of the country, 1,104 km from Ulaanbaatar. Its capital is Uliastai. The aimag is named after the Zavkhan River, which forms the border between Zavkhan and Gobi-Altai aimag.

Environment 

Locally, Zavkhan's environment is considered "Gobi-Khangai" (Говь хангай), since it connects the Gobi Desert in the south with the western Khangai Mountain Range and the broad lake basin of Khovd aimag. 

The highest peak in the province is Otgontenger (Отгонтэнгэр, lit. "youngest sky") both the highest (4,031 m) and only peak in the Khangai range capped with a permanent glacier. The mountain is located in the 95,510 hectare Otgon Tenger Strictly Protected Area, about 60 km east of Uliastai. An image of the mountain can be seen on the aimag's coat of arms. Otgontenger is associated with the Bodhisattva Ochirvaani (Очирваань). 

The western and south-western regions of Zavkhan contain the massive Bor Khyarin Els sand dunes that stretch for over 100 km within the Zavkhan, down into Gobi-Altai aimag. One of the largest lakes in Zavkhan, Bayan Nuur (баян нуур, "rich lake") is nestled among the dunes.

Climate  
Zavkhan has some of the coldest winter temperatures in Mongolia. It has even been known to snow in summer. In Tosontsengel, the largest sum in Zavkhan, winter temperatures as low as −52.9 °C (−63.2 °F) have been recorded. That sum also holds the record for the highest mean sea level barometric pressure ever recorded on Earth , measured on 19 December 2001.

Most precipitation falls in the summer months as rain, with some snow in the adjacent months of May and September. Winters are typically very dry.

Wildlife  
Aside from having massive livestock populations, Zavkhan's broad ecological regions and deep forests are home to a diverse population of wildlife: Gobi bears, Mongolian khulans, wild boars, spotted deers, argali, wild goats, ibexes, Mongolian wolves, Corsac foxes, marmots, mongooses, Eurasian lynxes, hares, and both Mongolian and goitered gazelle.

Many forest, mountain and migratory birds can be found in the aimag, including rare snowcocks and bobwhites, as well as swans, vultures, falcons and hawks. 

Fishing is a popular pastime in Zavkhan. Khar Nuur and Bayan Nuur lakes are rich with fish, and many of the hundreds of smaller rivers throughout the province provide decent fishing.

Population 
Population growth in Zavkhan aimag stopped in 1994, then migration out of the aimag (approx. 40,000 in 1995-2005) reduced its population to the end of 1979 level. The majority of the population is ethnic Khalkha but there are sizable Khotgoid and Kazakh minorities. 

{| class="wikitable"
|+ Zavkhan aimag population

|-
! 1956  census
! 1960  est.
! 1963  census
! 1969  census
! 1975  est.
! 1979  census
! 1981  est.
! 1989  census
! 1990  est.
! 1992  est.
! 1994  est.
! 1996  est.
! 1998  est.
! 2000  census
! 2002  est.
! 2005  est.
! 2008  est.
|-
| 55,100||61,000||60,000|| 70,800|| 76,000|| 79,800|| 81,700||88,500|| 91,960|| 102,834|| 103,150|| 102,341|| 100,905|| 87,686|| 83,516|| 78,668||76,614
|-
|}

Notable natives and residents  

 Punsalmaagiin Ochirbat, First President of Mongolia (1990-1997)
 Natsagiin Bagabandi, Second President of Mongolia (1997-2005)
 S. Damdinbazar Mongolian Jalkhanz Khotagt (Жалханз Хутагт, "reincarnated saint") Independence activist and Prime Minister of Mongolia (1922-1923)
 Begziin Yavuukhulan, Soviet Poet
 B. Jamsranjav, Mongolian Saint, Lama 
 S. Chimedtseren, Mongolian Saint, Lama

Economy 
Herders breed each of the "5 Kinds" (5-н хошуу мал)of animal in Zavkhan. In 2005, the aimag was home to 2,1 million head of livestock, among them 1,03 million sheep, 861,000 goats, 107,000 cattle and yaks, 101,000 horses, and 6,300 camels.

The area is also rich with mineral resources such as iron ore, tin, gold, copper, diamonds, molybdenum ore, and phosphorite. While Zavkhan's mineral wealth remains 
largely been unexploited, in 2012 the Golden Hill Project mine was built by Bayan Airag Exploration LLC outside of Durvuljin soum.

Transportation 

The old Uliastai Airport has two unpaved runways and is located close to the city, but it has no regular flights operating. Since 2002, the Donoi Airport (or "New Uliastai Airport") with one unpaved runway is located about 25 km west of the city and gets served by regular flights to and from Ulaanbaatar.

Administrative subdivisions 

{| class="wikitable"
|-
|+ The Sums of Zavkhan Aimag
|-
! Sum
! Mongolian
! Population (2005)
|-
| Aldarkhaan          ||  ||3,708
|- 
| Asgat                   ||  || 1,125
|-
| Bayankhairhan ||  || 1,968
|-
| Bayantes             ||  || 3,024
|-
| Dörvöljin           ||  ||2,323
|-
| Erdenekhairkhan || ||1,771
|- 
| Ider                     ||  ||2,714
|-
| Ikh-Uul               ||  ||6,271
|-
| Nömrög                 ||  ||1,848
|-
| Otgon                   ||  ||3,478
|-
| Santmargats       ||  ||2,101
|-
| Shilüüstei         ||  ||2,450
|-
| Songino               ||  ||1,921
|-
| Telmen                 ||  ||2,820
|-
| Tes                       ||  ||3,230
|-
| Tosontsengel     ||  ||9,045
|-
| Tsagaanchuluut ||  ||1,496
|-
| Tsagaankhairkhan || ||1,823
|- 
| Tsetsen-Uul       ||  ||2,114
|-
| Tüdevtei             ||  ||2,003
|-
| Uliastai *              ||  ||15,742
|-
| Urgamal               ||  ||1,822
|-
| Yaruu                   || ||2,547
|- 
| Zavkhanmandal   ||  ||1,324
|-
|}

* The aimag capital is Uliastai

References 

 
Provinces of Mongolia
States and territories established in 1931
1931 establishments in Mongolia